Anthony Vargas (born September 2, 1984) is an American educator and politician serving as a member of the Nebraska Legislature. Vargas represents the 7th district, which covers all of downtown Omaha and much of southeastern Omaha.

Early life and education 
Vargas was born to Antonio and Lidia Vargas in Queens, New York City, who were originally from Peru. He was the youngest of three brothers. He graduated from the University of Rochester and received a Master of Science in education from Pace University.

Career 
Vargas is a former public school teacher. He also served as an AmeriCorps fellow through Teach for America. Vargas was appointed to the Omaha Public Schools Board in 2013, following the resignation of a board member.

Nebraska Legislature 
In 2016 he ran for the Legislature against incumbent senator Nicole Fox. Fox, a Republican, finished third in the nonpartisan primary, which saw Vargas and former senator John Synowiecki advance to the general election. Vargas defeated Synowiecki in the general election with nearly 62% of the vote. He is the first outright elected Hispanic legislator in Nebraska.

Committees 
Vargas has served on the Appropriations Committee since 2017. In 2019, Vargas was elected by his peers, in a contested race, to the position of Vice Chair of the Executive Board, the nine member executive arm of the Legislature. In 2021, Vargas was re-elected by his peers to the position of Vice Chair of the Executive Board. He currently serves as the chair of the Legislature's Planning Committee, the long-term strategic planning committee for the Nebraska Legislature.

COVID-19 pandemic 
On July 29, 2020, Vargas attempted to suspend the Nebraska legislature's regular rules of order to introduce a bill that would enforce Centers for Disease Control and Prevention guidelines in meatpacking plants to respond to the COVID-19 pandemic. The motion failed to pass.

2022 congressional election 

In July 2021, Vargas announced his candidacy for Nebraska's 2nd congressional district in the 2022 election. He won the Democratic primary on May 10, 2022, but lost the general election against Republican incumbent Don Bacon in November.

Personal life
Vargas is married to his wife Lauren. He is a Catholic and resides in South Omaha, Nebraska. He has two children.

His father, Virgilio Antonio Vargas, died on April 29, 2020 from COVID-19 at the beginning of the global pandemic.

Electoral history

2016

2020

References

External links

 Tony Vargas for Congress campaign website
 Sen. Tony Vargas official legislative website

1984 births
21st-century American politicians
American politicians of Peruvian descent
Candidates in the 2022 United States House of Representatives elections
Catholics from New York (state)
Educators from New York City
Hispanic and Latino American state legislators
Living people
Democratic Party Nebraska state senators
Pace University alumni
Politicians from New York City
Politicians from Omaha, Nebraska
School board members in Nebraska
University of Rochester alumni
Teach For America alumni